Thoa Mehram Khan is a union council, an administrative subdivision, of Talagang in the Punjab Province of Pakistan, </ref>

References

Union councils of Chakwal District
Populated places in Chakwal District